Asaphiscus is a genus of trilobite that lived in the Cambrian. Its remains have been found in Australia and North America, especially in Utah.

Distribution 
 A. wheeleri occurs in the Middle Cambrian of the United States (Delamaran, Lower Wheeler Shale, Millard County, Utah, 40.0°N, 113.0°W; and Menevian, Wheeler Formation, House Range, Utah, 39.2° N, 113.3° W).

 Description Asaphiscus are average size trilobites of (up to ) with a rather flat calcified dorsal exoskeleton of inverted egg-shaped outline, about 1½× longer than wide, with the widest point near the back of the headshield (or cephalon). The cephalon is about 40% of the body length, is semi-circular in shape, has wide rounded genal angles, and a well defined border of about ⅛× the length of the cephalon. The central raised area of the cephalon (or glabella is conical in outline with a wide rounded front and is separated from the border by a preglabellar field of about ⅛× the length of the cephalon, and has 3 sets of furrows that may be clear or inconspicuous. The articulated middle part of the body (or thorax) has 7-11 segments (9 in A. wheeleri), with rounded tips. The tailshield (or pygidium) is about 30% of the body length, is semi-circular in shape, with a wide flat border, and an entire margin.

 Reassigned species 
Some species originally described as belonging to Asaphiscus have later been reassigned to other genera.
 A. capella = Glyphaspis capella A. granulatus = Genevievella granulata 
 A. gregarius = Blainia gregarius A. minor = Cedaria minor A. unispinus = Weeksina unispina Sources 
 A Pictorial Guide to Fossils'' by Gerard Ramon Case

References

External links
Asaphiscus in the Paleobiology Database

Ptychoparioidea
Ptychopariida genera
Cambrian trilobites of Australia
Cambrian trilobites of North America
Fossils of Georgia (U.S. state)
Wheeler Shale
Cambrian genus extinctions